Johnny Rioux is a musician primarily known for playing in and working with many punk rock bands. He was initially based in Boston, MA but is now based in Texas. Rioux is most known for his tenure as bass guitarist with the Street Dogs with whom he joined in 2003. In February 2020, Rioux and lead singer and founding member Mike McColgan announced that after 17 years the Street Dogs were disbanding.  He was mentioned in the song "Teenage Gluesniffer" by the Queers.

Rioux has also been in groups such as celtic rock band Murder the Stout (along with former Street Dogs guitarist Marcus Hollar) and Street Dogs' americana side project FM359. He has previously played with Roger Miret and the Disasters, The Bruisers and The Kickovers. He has also worked with bands in non-musician roles including as a guitar technician for The Mighty Mighty Bosstones and tour manager for Dropkick Murphys. He has recently started producing, and has so far produced for Flatfoot 56, the Street Dogs and Roger Miret and the Disasters.

In 2023, Rioux co-founded the band The Defiant which is fronted by former Mighty Mighty Bosstones singer Dicky Barrett and features members of The Offspring, Smash Mouth and The Briggs. The group will release their debut album in early 2023.

Discography

Performer 
 Elmer – Biblebanger 7" (1994)
 The Bruisers – Still Standing Up (1997)
 The Bruisers –  Molotov (1998)
 The Business – Mob Mentality (2000)
 Roger Miret and the Disasters –  Roger Miret and the Disasters (2002)
 The Kickovers– Osaka
 Street Dogs – Savin Hill (2003)
 Street Dogs – Back to the World (2005)
 Street Dogs – Fading American Dream (2006)
 Street Dogs – State of Grace (2008)
 Street Dogs – Street Dogs (2010)
 Roger Miret and the Disasters – Gotta Get Up Now (2011)
 Street Dogs – "Crooked Drunken Sons" 7" (2013)
 Street Dogs – "Rust Belt Nation" 7" (2013)
 Johnny Rioux – Cowboi! (2013)
 FM359 – Truth, Love & Liberty (2014)
 Street Dogs – Street Dogs / Noi!se (2014)
 Street Dogs – Stand For Something Or Die For Nothing (2018)

Producer 
 Street Dogs – Street Dogs (2010)
 Flatfoot 56 – Black Thorn (2010)
 Roger Miret and the Disasters – Gotta Get Up Now (2011)
 Flatfoot 56 – Toil (2012)
 Street Dogs – "Crooked Drunken Sons" 7" (2013)
 Street Dogs – "Rust Belt Nation" 7" (2013)
 Johnny Rioux – Cowboi! (2013)
 FM359 – Truth, Love & Liberty (2014)
 Street Dogs – Stand For Something Or Die For Nothing (2018)

Technical 
 Street Dogs – Street Dogs (2010)
 Flatfoot 56 – Black Thorn (2010)
 Street Dogs – "Crooked Drunken Sons" 7" (2013)
 Street Dogs – "Rust Belt Nation" 7" (2013)
 Bricktop – Murder at 45rpm (2013)
 FM359 – Truth, Love & Liberty (2014)
 Street Dogs – Street Dogs / Noi!se (2014)

References

Living people
1974 births
American rock bass guitarists
Musicians from Boston
Guitarists from Massachusetts
American male bass guitarists
Street Dogs members
21st-century American bass guitarists
21st-century American male musicians